Exochostoma is a genus of flies in the family Stratiomyidae.

Species
Exochostoma nitidum Macquart, 1842
Exochostoma ornatum Lindner, 1974
Exochostoma osellai Mason, 1995

References

Stratiomyidae
Brachycera genera
Taxa named by Pierre-Justin-Marie Macquart
Diptera of Asia
Diptera of Europe